The Two Sergeants (Italian:I due sergenti) is a 1913 Italian silent drama film directed by Eugenio Perego and starring Alberto Capozzi, Umberto Paradisi and Orlando Ricci. It is an adaptation of Théodore Baudouin d'Aubigny's 1823 play of the same title, which has been made into several films. It is set during the Napoleonic Wars.

Cast
 Alberto Capozzi as Capitano Derville / Guglielmo  
 Umberto Paradisi as Sergente Roberto  
 Orlando Ricci as Maresciallo  
 Egidio Candiani as Valentino  
 Giovanni Cuisa as Servente Tomasso 
 Giovanni Enrico Vidali as Aiutante Valmore  
 Michele Cuisa as Gustavo  
 Maria Gandini as Mamma Pia 
 Laura Darville 
 Cristina Ruspoli   
 Emilia Vidali

References

Bibliography
 Riccardo Redi. Cinema muto italiano: 1896-1930. Fondazione Scuola nazionale di cinema, 1999.

External links 
 

1913 films
1910s historical drama films
Italian historical drama films
Italian silent feature films
1910s Italian-language films
Films directed by Eugenio Perego
Italian films based on plays
Films set in the 19th century
Italian black-and-white films
1913 drama films
Silent drama films